Mano Ketenzhiev (born 14 July 1963) is a Bulgarian cross-country skier. He competed in the men's 15 kilometre classical event at the 1988 Winter Olympics.

References

1963 births
Living people
Bulgarian male cross-country skiers
Olympic cross-country skiers of Bulgaria
Cross-country skiers at the 1988 Winter Olympics
Place of birth missing (living people)